"Beautiful Now" is a song by Russian-born German musician Zedd from his second studio album, True Colors (2015), featuring vocals from American singer-songwriter Jon Bellion. It was written by Zedd, Bellion, Antonina Armato, David Jost, Tim James and Desmond Child. The song was released on May 13, 2015, as the album's second single. The song was commercially successful and has been featured on a number of worldwide music charts.

Background
On May 8, 2015, as part of his True Colors promotional campaign, Zedd premiered "Beautiful Now" at the Shedd Aquarium in Chicago, Illinois. Five days later, he announced that he would release the song onto iTunes at 9:00 PM PST. A few hours prior to its release, he tweeted the lyrics from the song's beat break: "BAH BAH BAH BABABAH BAH BAH BABABAH BAH BAH BAH BABABAH BABABABA". The official audio for the song was uploaded to Zedd's YouTube channel at that same time.

Composition
"Beautiful Now" is a progressive house song with influences of dance-pop written in the key of D major. It runs at 128 BPM.

Music video
The music video for "Beautiful Now", directed by Jonathan Desbiens, was released on June 11, 2015.

Synopsis
The video intertwines five different stories together. The first is of a woman who supposedly drowned her female lover in a pool; the second involves an elderly Central American man who is journeying on an unsuccessful mountain climbing attempt; the third involves the son of a man whose home is invaded by armed robbers; the fourth involves Zedd portraying a liquor store robber who becomes hostile with the management by threatening him with a knife; and the fifth depicts a distraught girl laying down on a railroad. As the song progresses, the video intercuts to scenes of family happiness, good times with friends, dancing and rejoicing before concluding the five stories. The first woman's lover is pulled from the water before drowning, and the ex realizes the gravity of the situation; the old man attempts to climb the mountain and falls, but survives, without reaching the summit; the armed robbery victim's son confronts the hostiles at gunpoint and subdues them; Zedd's character reflects over what sunk him to his current point in life and seems to change his ways; the suicidal girl is missed by the train and reflects on her life and why she chose such an extreme act. All five people in the stories see themselves in a reflection in various surfaces as their stories are closed and they all resolve to be better people.

Reception
As of February 28, 2023, the video has over 212 million views and over 1.9 million likes on Zedd's YouTube channel.

Track listing
CD single and digital download
 "Beautiful Now"  – 3:38

Digital download (Remixes EP)
 "Beautiful Now"  – 3:55
 "Beautiful Now"  – 4:00
 "Beautiful Now"  – 3:19
 "Beautiful Now"  – 4:15

Digital download (Dirty South Remix) (iTunes)
 "Beautiful Now"  – 3:18

Digital download (Dirty South Remix) (Spotify)
 "Beautiful Now"  – 2:53

Grey remix
On July 29, 2015, Los Angeles-based duo Grey released their remix of "Beautiful Now" on SoundCloud as a free download. The remix is known for its significant deviation in sound from the original, using a vocoder to give Bellion's vocals a different melody and robotic distortion, and accompanying them with a darker and melodically distinct background inspired by Egyptian music. The remix quickly began receiving coverage across electronic music websites and communities, and was acclaimed for its uniqueness and originality. It also became notable for only being Grey's first release despite its professionality, leading to speculation that the alias belonged to an experienced group of producers now going anonymous. The alias belongs to brothers Kyle and Michael Trewartha, the former of whom previously operated under the alias Singularity.

Eventually, the remix came to the attention of Zedd, who liked and reposted the remix to his official SoundCloud page, and later released the track for purchase on iTunes on September 11, 2015. Zedd has since continued to actively support Grey, playing their remix of Skrillex and Diplo's "Where Are Ü Now" featuring Justin Bieber at his True Colors Tour. He also went on to call Grey "hands down the best electronic music act right now" on Twitter. Grey has since officially remixed two other songs from True Colors; "Papercut" and "True Colors", and toured with Zedd in 2017 as part of his Echo Tour.

Charts

Weekly charts

Year-end charts

Certifications

See also
 List of number-one dance singles of 2015 (U.S.)

References

2014 songs
Songs written by Jon Bellion
Songs written by Desmond Child
Songs written by Antonina Armato
Songs written by Tim James (musician)
Zedd songs
Interscope Records singles
Songs written by Zedd
Songs written by David Jost